

Founded in 1876 as the U.S. Revenue Cutter Service School of Instruction, the United States Coast Guard Academy graduated their first African-American Cadet, Merle Smith, in 1966. Prior to 1962, there was one African-American Cadet, Javis Wright, admitted. Unfortunately he left due to medical reasons.  The Coast Guard Academy is the only federal military academy that does not require a Congressional appointment, and admission is strictly on the basis of the Scholastic Aptitude Test and consideration of extracurricular involvement. The entering class is usually between 200 and 300 cadets, with the entire four class student body consisting of no more than about 1000 cadets at any one time.

The first African-American appointment
President Kennedy's new frontier was to push the envelope in areas of national life that had not been reached during the terms of President Harry S. Truman or President Dwight D. Eisenhower. A Presidential Executive Order 9981 issued by President Truman had desegregated the armed forces on July 26, 1948, but the service academies were lagging in officer recruiting. As a precursor to President Lyndon B. Johnson's Great Society programs (Head Start, Civil Rights Act, Voting Rights Act, Medicare, and the appointment of Thurgood Marshall as the first Black Supreme Court Justice) President Kennedy challenged the U. S. Coast Guard Academy to tender appointments to black high school students soon after his inauguration.

The first African-American cadets
The Coast Guard Academy admitted Javis Leon Wright, Jr. into the Corps of Cadets in 1955. For two years, Wright competed with the academy's track and cross-country teams and was well liked by his fellow cadets. In 1957 he developed serious health problems and had to resign his appointment. Academy superintendent, Rear Admiral Frank Leamy had to accept the resignation, stating, “I regret that Cadet Wright must be separated from the Coast Guard. He has demonstrated the qualities of character, intelligence and interest that are desired in prospective Commissioned Officers of the Coast Guard."

In June 1962, Merle James Smith, Jr. was admitted to the Coast Guard Academy. In June 1966 he became the first African American to graduate.

No other black cadet was admitted until 1964 when London Steverson from Millington, Tennessee and Kenneth D. Boyd from Leonia, New Jersey were admitted as part of the Class of 1968.

Attrition rates for entering cadets were high, and the Class of 1968 was no exception. Of the 400 cadets entering in July 1964 as the Class of 1968, only 152 graduated. Both Steverson and Boyd, the two black cadets in this class, completed the four-year course of academic and military education and were graduated.

Because the orders to recruit the first black cadets were mandated through the chain-of-command from President John F. Kennedy, it might be thought that the first black cadets would to be treated well.  This was far from the truth because of make up of the Corps of Cadets. Nevertheless, there was very little attrition of black cadets between 1962 and 1972 as compared to the majority group of cadets. Two very gifted and talented Candidates from the Class of 1972, Robert Treadway Brown (Riverhead, NY) and Timothy Coon (Orange, NJ), left the academy before they graduated. However, most black cadets who entered graduated. There were several reasons for this. First, because of the unique bonds fused in the crucible of Chase Hall with all of those they called brothers. Also the specter of the draft during the Vietnam War. And the unprecedented opportunity to serve in the United States Coast Guard.

In 1964 the Coast Guard Officer Corps was 99.44 percent white. Less than one-half of one percent of the officer corps comprised black enlisted men who had been promoted to chief warrant officers. In 1973 the percentage of black officers was still below one percent, but progress had been made. Also, President Kennedy was no longer Commander-in-Chief. 

With the large influx of black cadets in 1973 and 1974 the attrition rate for black cadets reached astronomical levels. Up to 70 percent of the black cadets entering were forced to resign before graduation. It appears that the upper-class cadets were given the green light to weed out and to eliminate the less qualified black entering cadets. The alternative hypothesis is that there were other opportunities for young, talented and gifted youngsters.  

At the Academy they had not been prepared for integration. The all white officer corps was not prepared to accept the black officers into the Ward Room with all the rights and privileges of white officers. Most of the white officers, both northerners and southerners, had never been to school with black students and were not ready to live, work or take orders from them on ships and bases. The senior officers proved to be especially hostile to the new breed of officer.

There were also difficulties when these new officers were deployed. He received such adverse fitness reports from his senior officers that he had to be removed from the ship. An Academy graduate is required to serve five years of obligated service before he can resign his commission. Kenny Boyd was not allowed complete his obligated service.  

London Steverson was promoted to lieutenant commander in 1978, but he did not receive a promotion during the last ten years of his career. In six years, he was passed over five times for promotion to commander. By an act of Congress an officer attaining the rank of lieutenant commander is allowed to remain on active duty until the earliest date that he is eligible for retirement. Steverson was forced to retire in July 1988 with 20 years of active service. His last two years of active duty at Governors Island, New York were very aggravating. After completing a tour of duty at the National Narcotics Border Interdiction System, he was relieved of all responsibilities and administratively assigned to Coast Guard Base Governors Island. He was required to report for work every morning, but he had no official position.

It was not until 1994 that Captain Joseph Jones, USCGA Class of 1972, took command of the Dallas becoming the first black officer to command a  cutter.

The bridge builder

In July 1972 Lieutenant London Steverson was reassigned from Juneau, Alaska to Washington, D.C. He became the Chief of the newly formed Minority Recruiting Section at Coast Guard Headquarters.

As the Chief of the Minority Recruiting Section he desegregated the all-white United States Coast Guard Academy by recruiting more than 50 minority cadets in a two-year period from 1973 to 1974.

From 1876 until 1962 the Academy had not admitted any African-American cadets (with the exception of Javis Leon Wright, Jr in 1955). Given a free hand, open traveling orders, and a budget Steverson was able to reach out to the parents of the best and the brightest in the black community across the nation. He attended the National Conventions of the NAACP, Operation PUSH, and the Black American Law Students. He established a Sponsor Program where an active duty officer was given the name, address, and telephone number of the most promising applicants to maintain their interest in the Academy. He sponsored familiarization trips to the Academy for the applicants and their parents for all finalist who were interested in seeing the Academy grounds. The first year on the job he was able to recruit 28 prospective cadets to the steps of Chase Hall on Admissions Day to take the Cadet Oath. The second year, using the same programs, he was able to recruit another 20 African-American high school graduates to be sworn in as cadets. It was from these African-American high school students that the Coast Guard's first officers of flag rank were to come in the 1990s; the two officers are Rear Admiral Erroll M. Brown and Vice Admiral Manson K. Brown. Vice Admiral Brown was personally recruited from St. John's College High School in Washington, DC. Steverson was charged with recruiting cadets for the Academy because that is where the bulk of the career officers would come from. However, he was also requested to find minority college graduates who would receive direct commissions as lawyers and as aviators. He recruited several lawyers from Vanderbilt Law School. These officers were college graduates and had no need to attend the four-year Academy. They received a three-month orientation course at the Coast Guard Officer Training Center at Yorktown, Virginia.

Many firsts
There have been many historic firsts accomplished by African-American Coast Guard Academy graduates.

 1966 - Merle James Smith became the first African-American to graduate from the Academy.
 1977 - Bobby C. Wilks became the first African-American to be promoted to the rank of captain.
 1978 - Manson K. Brown USCGA '78 became the first black regimental commander in the 101-year history of the Coast Guard Academy.
 1980 - Joseph Jones, USCGA '72 became the first pre-com & CO of the newly constructed USCGC NEAH BAY (WTGB 105)
 1983 - Angela Dennis and Daphne Reese became the first black female graduates of the Coast Guard Academy.
 1988 - Commander Merle Smith USCGA '66 and Lieutenant Commander London Steverson USCGA '68 became the first African-American Coast Guard Academy graduates to retire from the Coast Guard. Smith was the first African American graduate of the Coast Guard Academy while Steverson was the second African-American graduate of the Academy.
 1990 - Joseph Jones, USCGA '72 became the CO of the 210-foot cutter USCGC RELIANCE (WMEC 615)
 1993 - Joseph Jones, USCGA '72 became the third Senior Fellow to the Chief of Naval Operations, Strategic Studies Group XIII
 1994 - Joseph Jones, USCGA '72 became the CO of the 378-foot cutter USCGC DALLAS (WHEC 716)
 1998 - Erroll M. Brown USCGA '72 became the first black admiral in the Coast Guard.
 2000 - Jacqueline P. James was the first black female engineering graduate from the United States Coast Guard Academy with a Bachelor of Science in Civil Engineering.
 2001 - Ensign Andrea Parker became the first African-American female to graduate with an engineering degree from the Coast Guard Academy.
 2002 - Ensign Anya F. Hughes became the first African-American female to graduate with a Mechanical Engineering Degree from the United States Coast Guard Academy.
 2005 - Lieutenant (Junior Grade) Jeanine McIntosh, was awarded her wings at a ceremony at Naval Air Station Corpus Christi, after completing her flight training there.  She is the first black female Coast Guard aviator.
 2005 - Manson K. Brown USCGA '78 was promoted to rear admiral (lower half).
 2006 - Aaron Davenport, USCGA '84 became the first RAND Executive Military Fellow to the RAND National Defense Research Institute.
 2007 - Second Class (junior year) Cadet DeCarol Davis has been named one of 65 Truman Scholars for 2007 by the Harry S. Truman Scholarship Foundation.  Davis was selected out of the total 585 candidates nominated from 280 colleges and universities nationwide. She is not only the first African-American cadet to receive this award at the Academy but the first Cadet in the history of the Academy.
 2007 - Aaron Davenport, USCGA '84 became the first White House Homeland Security Advisor to Vice President Richard Cheney and then later to Vice President Joseph Biden in 2009.
 2010 - Aaron Davenport, USCGA '84 became the second black Senior Fellow to the Chief of Naval Operations, Strategic Studies Group XXX
 2010 - Manson K. Brown USCGA '78 was promoted to vice admiral.
 2014 - Manson K. Brown USCGA '78 retired from the Coast Guard. VADM Brown is, thus far, the highest ranking African-American to have served in the Coast Guard.

Programs targeting African-American prospective students

Eclipse Diversity Weekend
High school sophomores, juniors, and seniors with appointment offers join Academy graduates and cadets for this annual celebration of diversity. This two-day event brings African-American alumni home to renew friendships and professional ties, and to mentor current and future cadets. Eclipse kicks off Friday afternoon with a cadet parade and ends Saturday afternoon with a talent show. Guests are paired with cadet escorts and stay overnight in the cadet barracks.

Super Saturday
Designed with the interests and perspectives of underrepresented students and their families in mind, this six-hour Saturday program is offered three times a year and is limited in size to allow greater personal contact with cadets, Admissions staff, faculty members and graduates. Guests attend a slide show, a question and answer session, receive a tour of campus, and enjoy lunch in the Cadet Wardroom.

Notes
Citations

References used

Further reading
Excerpts from Integration of the Armed Forces 1940-1965, Defense Studies Series. Washington D.C.: United States Army Center of Military History, 1985.:
 Chapter 03 -  World War II: The Navy    - includes some information on integration on Coast Guard cutters.
 Chapter 04 World War II: The Marine Corps and the Coast Guard -
 Chapter 20 Limited Response to Discrimination - includes info about President John F. Kennedy's personal involvement with the first attempts to desegregate the Coast Guard Academy.

External links
 USCG Diversity Management Division webpage
 USCG COMPASS Program
 Minorities and the Coast Guard
 USCG Academy History
 Rear Adm. Erroll M. Brown retires on June 30, 2005, after 33 years of service.
  After 36 years of service, VADM Manson K. Brown retires from active duty - See more at: http://allhands.coastguard.dodlive.mil/2014/05/14/after-36-years-of-service-vadm-manson-k-brown-retires-from-active-duty/#.dpuf
 https://web.archive.org/web/20060508072405/http://www.medalofhonor.com/CoastGuardAcademys1stAfricanAmerican.htm

United States Coast Guard Academy
African-American United States Coast Guard personnel